The MTP96 is a Landing Craft Vehicle Personnel used by the Marina Militare and Esercito Italiano.

History 

Twenty of these crafts are on board the three San Marco class LPD ships and used by Brigata Marina San Marco to Brindisi Naval Station homeport.
A few others are used by 1st Lagunari Regiment Serenissima of Esercito Italiano into Venezia lagoon.

Landing craft

References

External links
 Ships Marina Militare website

Ships built in Italy
Amphibious warfare vessels of the Italian Navy
Amphibious warfare vessel classes
Landing craft